Fernando José "Ferran" Gallego Margaleff (born 1953) is a Spanish historian and writer.

Biography 
Born in Barcelona in 1953, he earned a PhD in Contemporary History. He is professor at the Autonomous University of Barcelona (UAB). Author of a long list of works, he has studied the contemporary history of Spain, the Latin-American caudillismos and populisms, European fascisms, and 20th-century Germany. He is an expert in the Spanish and wider European extreme right.

Works 

Author
 
 
 
 
 
 
 
 
 
 
 
 
Editor

References 
Informational notes

Citations

Bibliography
 
 
 
 
 
 
 
 
 
 
 
 
 
 
 

Living people
1953 births
Historians of Nazism
Historians of fascism
Academics and writers on far-right extremism
Historians of the Spanish transition to democracy
Historians of Francoist Spain
Academic staff of the Autonomous University of Barcelona
People from Barcelona